Joseph Hubbard Echols (December 25, 1816 – September 23, 1885) was a prominent Confederate politician. He was born in Wilkes County, Georgia and served in the state legislature in 1861. He was elected to represent Georgia in the Second Confederate Congress from 1864 to 1865. 
 

1816 births
1885 deaths
People from Wilkes County, Georgia
Members of the Confederate House of Representatives from Georgia (U.S. state)
19th-century American politicians
Methodists from Georgia (U.S. state)